The Mercedes-Benz M04 engine is a naturally-aspirated, 3.0-liter and 3.1-liter, straight-6, internal combustion piston engine, designed, developed and produced by Mercedes-Benz; between 1927 and 1928.

M04 engine
At the back, however, the final drive ratio was changed from 5.4 :1 to 4.8 : 1, and the listed top speed went up to 108 km/h (67 mph)

Having raised the final drive and the top speed for 1927, the manufacturer now moved to offer a choice of ratios, either reducing it back to 5.4 :1 or raising it further to 5.8 :1. The former ratio was described as the “Flachland” (flat lands) version while the latter as the “Berg” (mountain) version. At the same time a small increase in the cylinder stroke accounted for an increase in overall engine capacity to 3,131 cc.

Applications
Mercedes-Benz 12/55 hp Type 320 Sedan

References

Mercedes-Benz engines
Straight-six engines
Engines by model
Gasoline engines by model